Qinlinglu is a metro station of Zhengzhou Metro Line 1.

The station is located at the crossing of Jianshe Road and Qinling Road, and named after Qinling Road.

Station layout 
The station has 2 floors underground. The B1 floor is for the station concourse and the B2 floor is for the platforms and tracks. The station has one island platform and two tracks for Line 1.

Exits

Surroundings
Zhengzhou West Coach Station (汽车客运西站)
CCmall (大摩西元广场)

References

Stations of Zhengzhou Metro
Line 1, Zhengzhou Metro
Railway stations in China opened in 2013